Gharana Mogudu is a 1992 Indian Telugu-language romantic drama film directed by K. Raghavendra Rao. The film stars Chiranjeevi, Nagma and Vani Viswanath with Rao Gopal Rao and Kaikala Satyanarayana in supporting roles. Music is composed by M. M. Keeravani and A. Vincent handled the cinematography. It is a remake of the 1986 Kannada film Anuraga Aralithu.

Released on 9 April 1992, the film became the first Telugu film to collect over 10 crore distributor share at the box office. The film made Chiranjeevi the highest-paid actor in India, with the English-language weekly magazine The Week describing him as "Bigger Than Bachchan".  The film was screened at the 1993 International Film Festival of India in the mainstream section.

Plot
Raju (Chiranjeevi) is a do-gooder who helps his co-workers in a Visakhapatnam shipyard, but when his mother suffers a paralytic stroke, he moves back to Hyderabad and looks for a job. Uma Devi (Nagma), daughter of industrialist Bapineedu (Raogopal Rao) takes over the business from her father and helps it to reach new heights, which also sees her head-strong ways reach new heights. In this scenario, she not only rejects Ranganayakulu's (Kaikala Satyanarayana) son's marriage proposal, but insults them when the father-son duo show up at her house. To get their revenge, they send goons to kill Uma Devi. As fate would have it, Bapineedu shows up in the car instead of Uma Devi and is rescued by Raju, who asks him for a job, which Bapineedu readily agrees to.

Raju wins over the employees in no time and takes on the high-handedness of Uma Devi and her management. This leads to constant conflict and Uma Devi decides to marry Raju, so that he will not interfere anymore. To this end, she emotionally blackmails Raju's mother and eventually makes Raju agree to marry her. But Raju continues to trouble her even after marriage. Uma Devi's secretary, Bhavani (Vani Viswanath), is also a friend of Raju, which leads to jealousy. In the meantime, Ranganayakulu, with the help of Uma Devi's manager Sarangapani (Ahuti Prasad) schemes against Uma Devi to sabotage her factory. The rest of film deals with how Raju thwarts the schemes of Ranganayakulu and teaches Uma Devi to be humble.

Cast
 Chiranjeevi as Raju
 Nagma as Uma Devi
 Vani Viswanath as Bhavani
 Raogopal Rao as Bapineedu
 Kaikala Satyanarayana as Ranganayakulu
 Brahmanandam as Appanna
 Sharat Saxena as Ranganayakulu's son
 Ramaprabha as Uma Devi's servant
 Shubha as Raju's mother
 Ahuti Prasad as Sarangapani
 Ponnambalam as Veeraiah
 Sakshi Ranga Rao as Bhawani's father
 Chalapathi Rao as Chalapathi
 P. L. Narayana as Narayana
 Disco Shanti as item number in the song "Bangaru Kodi Petta"
 Gautam Raju

Soundtrack

The music and the background score of the movie were composed by M. M. Keeravani, the lyrics for the songs are by Bhuvanachandra and M. M. Keeravani. The song "Bangaru Kodi Petta" was later remixed by M. M. Keeravani in the 2009 Telugu blockbuster Magadheera. Keeravani later reused "Hey Pilla" as "Hey Babu" for Hindi film Is Raat Ki Subah Nahin.

å==Box office==
The movie was received very well at the  collecting a share of over 10.8 crore and becoming the first Telugu film to collect a share of 10 crore.

 Gharana Mogudu collected a distributors' share of 1.35 crore in its opening week.
 The film had a 100-day run in 56 centres and a 175-day run in three centres including a 183-day run in Sandhya 70mm, Hyderabad.
 It was dubbed into Malayalam as Hey Hero. It was successful in Kerala and it had run  175 days in the same theatre in Trivandrum.

Awards
Filmfare Award for Best Film - Telugu - K. Devi Vara Prasad

References

External links 
 

1992 films
Films scored by M. M. Keeravani
Films directed by K. Raghavendra Rao
Telugu remakes of Kannada films
1990s Telugu-language films
Indian action drama films
1990s masala films
1992 action films